Birmingham Public Schools (BPS), formally the Birmingham City School District, is the public school district for Birmingham, Michigan. Beyond Birmingham, the district provides public school services for Southfield Township, Michigan, which encompasses the villages of Beverly Hills, Bingham Farms, and Franklin; and parts of these municipalities: Bloomfield Hills, Bloomfield Township, Southfield (city), Troy and West Bloomfield Township, Michigan. The current superintendent is Dr. Embekka Roberson.

History
In 1834, the first "district" school in Birmingham opened. This school was housed in John Hamilton's old log house at Hamilton Road and Old Woodward Ave. Rev. Lemuel M. Partridge served as the teacher. In 1855, the brick "Old Red Schoolhouse" was built at Maple and Southfield roads and served as a school until 1869. The Allen House, part of the Birmingham Historical Museum, now stands where the school was.  A new school was in 1869 and became the site of Birmingham's first high school.  That first high school later became known as Baldwin High School, then in 1951, Birmingham High School, and in 1959, Seaholm High School.  The former Baldwin High School later became Birmingham's first middle school.  

Through the 1930s other districts had their own elementary schools and sent paid tuition students to Baldwin High School in the Birmingham district. Throughout the 1940s, other school districts in the area were encouraged by the state to join Birmingham's school district. Southfield joined in 1943, Bloomfield Village in 1946, Franklin in 1945 and Walnut Lake in 1947.

Schools
Birmingham Public Schools runs eight elementary schools, one 3–8th grade school, two middle schools, two high schools, and one alternative high school. Each elementary school hosts a half day preschool program  and the district also runs a preschool program out of Midvale BPS Early Childcare Center.

 Groves High School
 Seaholm High School
 Lincoln Street Alternative school
 Berkshire Middle School
 Derby Middle School
 Birmingham Covington School
 Beverly Elementary School
 Bingham Farms Elementary School
 Pembroke Elementary School
 Pierce Elementary School
 West Maple Elementary School
 Quarton Elementary School
 Greenfield Elementary School
 Harlan Elementary School (New building opened 2007, replacing original 1957 building)

External links
 http://www.birmingham.k12.mi.us/
 http://bcsonline.info
 http://www.bhamgov.org/history/museum/early_school_history.php
 http://www.bhamgov.org/history/museum/birmingham_schools_the_modern_era.php
 https://web.archive.org/web/20120218030520/http://beverly.birmingham.k12.mi.us/?

References

School districts in Michigan
Education in Oakland County, Michigan
1834 establishments in Michigan Territory